Ottavio Leoni (1578 – 1630) was an Italian painter and printmaker of the early-Baroque, active mainly in Rome.

Life
Ottavio Leoni (sometimes spelled 'Lioni'), draughtsman and engraver was in his day the most fashionable portraitist in Rome. He is sometimes also referred to as the Cavaliere Ottavio, il Padovano, il Padovanino or Cavaliere Padovano .  He was born in Rome, where he first trained with his father, Lodovico Leoni. He painted altarpieces for churches in Rome such as an Annunciation for Sant'Eustachio and a Virgin and child with St. Giacinto for Santa Maria della Minerva, and a Saints Charles, Francis, & Nicholas for Sant’ Urbano. He became a member, and later president, of the Accademia di San Luca and a Cavalieri of the Order of Christ, on which occasion he presented the church of the Academy the Martyrdom of St. Martina. He died in Rome. Ottavio Leoni was also the engraver of a set of portraits of painters. His portrait of Michelangelo Merisi Caravaggio is the only documented portrait of the painter by another artist.

His work is exhibited in places such as Fine Arts Museums of San Francisco; Museum of Fine Arts, Boston; National Gallery of Art; Bowes Museum; Courtauld Institute of Art; Los Angeles County Museum of Art; and Palazzo Ruspoli, Rome, Italy.

References

External links

 
 View works by Leoni
 Volume containing 27 drawings by Leoni conserved in the Biblioteca Marucelliana in Florence (in Italian)

1578 births
1630 deaths
Painters from Rome
16th-century Italian painters
Italian male painters
17th-century Italian painters
Italian Baroque painters